The men's 800 metres was middle-distance running event on the athletics programme at the 1900 Summer Olympics in Paris. It was held on July 14 and July 16, 1900. The races were held on a track of 500 metres in circumference. 18 athletes from seven nations competed. The event was won by Alfred Tysoe of Great Britain, the nation's first medal in the event. The United States also won its first medals in the 800 metres, with silver and bronze.

Background

This was the second appearance of the event, which is one of 12 athletics events to have been held at every Summer Olympics. None of the runners from 1896 returned. Among the favorites were Alexander Grant of the United States (1899 AAU one-mile champion) and Alfred Tysoe of Great Britain (1897 AAA one-mile champion).

Bohemia, Denmark, Italy, and the United States appeared in the event for the first time. France, Great Britain, and Hungary each made their second appearance, having also appeared in 1896.

Competition format

There were two rounds: heats and a final. There were three heats, of between 5 and 7 runners each. The top 2 runners in each heat advanced to the final.

Records

These were the standing world and Olympic records (in minutes) prior to the 1900 Summer Olympics.

In the first heat of the first round David Hall set a new Olympic record with 1:59.0.

Schedule

Results

Semifinals

In the first round, there were three semifinals. The top two runners in each advanced to the final.

Semifinal 1

Hall's Olympic record time surprised most of those present, as Tysoe had been the favorite in the heat.

Semifinal 2

Deloge finished three yards in front of Spiedl, with the other runners trailing.

Semifinal 3

Cregan won the slowest of the three heats by six yards.

Final

Deloge led early, but was passed just before the final straight by Tysoe and Cregan. Hall, who had set an Olympic record in the heats, was just barely able to catch Deloge to finish third, but had no chance of passing the two leaders.

Results summary

References

Sources
 International Olympic Committee.
 De Wael, Herman. Herman's Full Olympians: "Athletics 1900". Accessed 18 March 2006.
 

Men's 0800 metres
800 metres at the Olympics